ZBC may refer to:

 The IATA location identifier for Colmore Row Bus Station - Birmingham (UK)
 Zimbabwe Broadcasting Corporation
 Zion Bible College, a bible college in Haverhill, Massachusetts, now called Northpoint Bible College